The Essential Allman Brothers Band: The Epic Years is a greatest hits album by the Allman Brothers Band released in 2004. The album is put out by their former label, Epic Records, and is part of then-Sony BMG's The Essential series. The album has songs created by the band from their switch to Epic for their 1989 reformation until they left the label in 2003. What is now Sony Music Entertainment also owns the band's releases on Arista Records.

Track listing
"Good Clean Fun" (Gregg Allman, Dickey Betts, Johnny Neel) – 5:08
"Seven Turns" (Dickey Betts) – 5:05
"End of the Line" (Gregg Allman, Warren Haynes, Allen Woody, John Jaworowicz) – 4:39
"Nobody Knows" (Dickey Betts) – 10:59
"Get on With Your Life" (Gregg Allman) – 6:58
"No One to Run With" (Dickey Betts, John Prestia) – 5:59
"Soulshine" (Warren Haynes) – 6:44
"Blue Sky" (Live) (Dickey Betts) – 8:40
"Midnight Rider" (Live) (Gregg Allman, Robert Payne) – 3:10
"Jessica" (Live) (Dickey Betts) – 16:07
"Please Call Home" (Live) (Gregg Allman) – 4:30

Tracks 1–2 from Seven Turns (1990)
Tracks 3–5 from Shades of Two Worlds (1991)
Tracks 6–7 from Where It All Begins (1994)
Track 8 from An Evening with the Allman Brothers Band: First Set (1992)
Track 9 from Mycology: An Anthology (1998)
Track 10 from An Evening with the Allman Brothers Band: 2nd Set (1995)
Track 11 from Peakin' at the Beacon (2000)

Live Songs

Track 8 recorded in 1991
Track 9 recorded 6/11/1992 at the R&R Club in Los Angeles, CA
Track 10 recorded 7/1/1994 at the Walnut Creek Amphitheatre in Raleigh, NC
Track 11 recorded 3/2000 at the Beacon Theatre in New York, NY

Personnel
Gregg Allman – keyboards, guitar, lead and background vocals
Dickey Betts – guitar, lead and background vocals
Butch Trucks – drums, percussion (Tracks 1–8, 10–11)
Jai Johanny Johanson – drums, percussion (Tracks 1–8, 11)
Warren Haynes – guitar, background vocals (Tracks 1–10)
Allen Woody – bass, background vocals (Tracks 1–10)
Johnny Neel – keyboards, background vocals (Tracks 1–2)
Marc Quiñones – percussion, background vocals (Tracks 3–8, 10–11)
Paul T. Riddle – drums (Track 10)
Derek Trucks – guitar (Track 11)
Oteil Burbridge – bass (Track 11)

References

2005 greatest hits albums
Epic Records compilation albums
The Allman Brothers Band compilation albums